Steven Folly Nador (born 23 June 2002) is a footballer who plays as a defender for Italian  club Montevarchi Aquila on loan from SPAL. Born in Germany, he represents Togo internationally.

Club career
Following the bankruptcy of his club Chievo, in August 2021 Nador joined the Under-19 squad of SPAL.

He made his Serie B debut for SPAL on 6 November 2021 in a game against Cremonese.

On 1 September 2022, Nador was loaned by Montevarchi Aquila.

International career
On 18 March 2022, Nador was called up to the Togo national team. He debuted with them as a late sub in a friendly 2–1 loss to the Ivory Coast on 25 September 2022.

Personal life
Born in Germany, he grew up in France and he is of Togolese descent.

References

External links
 

Living people
2002 births
Sportspeople from Krefeld
Togolese footballers
Togo international footballers
German footballers
German people of Togolese descent
German sportspeople of African descent
Association football defenders
Lille OSC players
A.C. ChievoVerona players
S.P.A.L. players
Montevarchi Calcio Aquila 1902 players
Serie B players
Serie C players
Togolese expatriate footballers
German expatriate footballers
German expatriate sportspeople in France
Expatriate footballers in France
German expatriate sportspeople in Italy
Expatriate footballers in Italy
Footballers from North Rhine-Westphalia